"On a Mission" is a song written by Ira Dean, David Lee Murphy and Kim Tribble, and recorded by American country music group Trick Pony.  It was released in August 2002 as the first single and title track from the album On a Mission.  The song reached number 19 on the Billboard Hot Country Singles & Tracks chart.

Music video
The music video was directed by Gerry Wenner and premiered in mid-2002.

Chart performance
"On a Mission" debuted at number 58 on the U.S. Billboard Hot Country Singles & Tracks for the week of August 31, 2002.

References

2003 singles
2002 songs
Trick Pony songs
Songs written by David Lee Murphy
Warner Records singles
Songs written by Kim Tribble